Senator Woodard may refer to:

Duane Woodard (born 1938), Colorado State Senate
Mike Woodard (politician) (born 1959), North Carolina State Senate
Willard Woodard (1824–1891), Illinois State Senate

See also
Senator Woodward (disambiguation)
Senator Woodyard (disambiguation)